The 1961 Philadelphia Eagles season was the franchise's 29th season in the National Football League.

Off-season 
Since 1951, the Eagles have held their training camp at Hersheypark Stadium in Hershey, Pennsylvania.

NFL Draft 
The 1961 NFL Draft and the 1961 AFL Draft were separate drafts, and players could end up being drafted by both leagues.

The NFL Draft of 20 rounds with 14 teams picking were separate drafts for college players and took place on December 27–28, 1960, immediately after their win in the NFL Championship Game on December 26. The Eagles would picked last by going 10–2 in the 1960 season. As was the rule then, teams picked by previous season record, with that Cleveland Browns pick ahead of NFL runner-up Green Bay Packers. This draft was also the first regular draft for the Dallas Cowboys as they had participated only in the 1960 NFL Expansion Draft that year. The Cowboys held the worst record in the NFL the previous season, but selected second in this draft because of the entry of the Minnesota Vikings into the league. The league would later hold an expansion draft for the Vikings' expansion franchise, and the Vikings were also awarded the first selection position in this draft.

The AFL draft was held on 2 dates 2 weeks apart at the end of the 1960 college season but before the bowl games. The first was a six-round draft held by phone. The second was held December 5 and 6, 1960 for rounds 7 through 30. The Denver Broncos selected New Mexico State's Bob Gaiters as the overall first draft pick.

The Philadelphia Eagles lost their first-round pick to the AFL for the second year. About half of the Eagles' 19 picks either signed with the AFL or remained in college to play their last year of eligibility.

Player selections

Preseason 
 August 4, Chicago All-Star Game: Eagles 28, All-Stars 14

Regular season

Schedule 

Note: Intra-conference opponents are in bold text.

Standings

Playoff Bowl

Awards and honors

References

External links
 Eagles on Pro Football Reference
 Eagles on jt-sw.com

Philadelphia Eagles seasons
Philadelphia Eagles
Philadel